Per Heike Hedlund (born 15 March 1942) is a retired Swedish speed skater. He competed in the 500 m event at the 1964 and 1968 Winter Olympics and finished in 7th and 15th place, respectively.

References

External links
 

1942 births
Living people
Olympic speed skaters of Sweden
Speed skaters at the 1964 Winter Olympics
Speed skaters at the 1968 Winter Olympics
Swedish male speed skaters
People from Östersund
Sportspeople from Jämtland County
20th-century Swedish people